La Groutte is a commune in the Cher department in the Centre-Val de Loire region of France.

Geography

Population

Sights
 The Gallo-Roman archaeological site.
 The restored limekilns.

See also
Communes of the Cher department

References

External links

Official commune website 

Communes of Cher (department)